Evci may refer to the following places in Turkey:

 Evci, Alaca, Çorum Province
 Evci, Ayaş, Ankara Province
 Evci, Bayat, Çorum Province
 Evci, Boğazkale, Çorum Province
 Evci, Haymana, Ankara Province
 Evci, Tufanbeyli, Adana Province